Lemonia dumi is a species of moth of the family Brahmaeidae (older classifications placed it in Lemoniidae). It is found in scattered populations in Central Europe.

The wingspan is 45–65 mm. The moth flies from October to November depending on the location.

The larvae feed on Hieracium and Taraxacum species.

References

External links
 Fauna Europaea
 Lepiforum.de taxonomy and photos

Moths described in 1761
Brahmaeidae
Moths of Europe
Moths of Asia
Taxa named by Carl Linnaeus